Grand Cru (great growth) is the highest level in the vineyard classification of Burgundy. In 2010, 18,670 hectoliters of Burgundy Grand Cru wine was produced, corresponding to 2.5 million bottles, or just over 1.3% of the total wine production of Burgundy.

The origin of Burgundy's Grand crus can be traced to the work of the Cistercians who, from amongst their vast land holdings in the region, were able to delineate and isolate plots of land that produced wine of distinct character. Following the French Revolution many of these vineyards were broken up and sold as smaller parcels to various owners. The partible inheritance scheme outlined in the Napoleonic code, which specified that all inheritance must be equally divided among heirs, further contributed to the parceling of Burgundy's vineyards. This created situations such as the case of Clos Vougeot, a single  vineyard run by the monks, that today is parceled into plots owned by nearly 80 different owners, some of whom only own enough vines to make a case of wine per vintage. In accordance with Appellation d'origine contrôlée laws, each of these owners is entitled to use the Grand Cru Clos de Vougeot designation on their labels, although the quality, style, price and reputation of each owner's wine can vary widely.

List of Grands Crus

See also
Burgundy wine
List of Chablis crus

Notes

References

Grand Crus
Wine-related lists